

The Cook Islands Federation was created in 1891, after the Kingdom of Rarotonga was given the island of Aitutaki. It lasted until 1901, when it was given to New Zealand.

Geography

The Cook Islands Federation was made up of the islands of Rarotonga, Mangaia, Atiu, Mauke, Mitiaro and Aitutaki.

Economy

Law
The laws of the Cook Islands Federation were made by the local parliament, however, they had to receive approval from a Resident from Britain. In 1899, the Parliament of Cook Islands ruled that the high court of the Cook Islands Federation could not give any punishment worse than those outlined by the Criminal Code Act of 1893, and The Summary Jurisdiction Act of 1894, which were both laws of New Zealand, and that both acts of New Zealand were to be adopted entirely.

Penal colonies
In 1892, the island of Takutea was set up as a penal colony, but in 1899 its use ceased, and the island of Manuae was used instead.

See also
History of the Cook Islands

Sources

Rarotonga, Kingdom of
States and territories established in 1893
Former federations
States and territories disestablished in 1901
1893 establishments in the British Empire
Former British colonies and protectorates in Oceania
1893 in Oceania
Former colonies in Oceania